The Shompole Conservancy is a large privately operated conservation area in the south of the Great Rift Valley, Kenya.
It is located between Lake Magadi to the north and Lake Natron to the south, two alkaline lakes.

The conservancy is in the Magadi division.
The conservancy covers part of the  Shompole group ranch, registered in 1979 and owned by the Loodokilani Maasai with over 2000 registered members.
The lodge was closed in September 2011 while the owners discussed its future and that of the conservancy with the local Maasai community.

The conservancy has a dry climate, hottest in October and November and most likely to be wet in April and May.
Flora are adapted to semi-arid conditions and include umbrella thorn trees and the colorful toothbrush tree.
The main source of water is the Ewaso Ng'iro (Brown River) which originates in the Mau forest to the north and flows into Lake Natron. There are riverine thickets along the banks of the river.
Wildlife include giraffe, buffalo, elephants and desert antelope such as gerenuk and oryx.

References

Sources

 
 
 

Tourist attractions in Kenya
Parks in Kenya